The National Association of Naval Volunteer Corps (SVK RF), commonly known as the Swedish Auxiliary Naval Corps (SVK) is a Swedish auxiliary defence organization that cooperate with the Swedish Armed Forces.

Task 
The task of SNV is to give further education to seamen and officers of the Swedish Navy, to provide personnel to the marine parts of the Swedish Home Guard and to introduce young people to the work in the Navy and other maritime professions through their youth organization known as the Swedish Sea Cadet Corps (SSCC). SNV is also a part of the International Sea Cadet Association through the SSCC.

Swedish Sea Cadet Corps

The Swedish Auxiliary Naval Corps run summer schools for young people aged 15–19 years. On the three-week-long summer schools, cadets are taught about seamanship, navigation, first aid, sailing, military demeanour, military history, defence knowledge, friendship, and everything else a navy man or woman is expected to be.

In their first summer cadets go on the Basic Course (Grundkurs), in their second summer cadets go on the Advanced Course (Fortsättningskurs) that provides advanced sailing skills, and in their third summer cadets go on the Internship Course (Praktikkurs), which provides practical knowledge in operating and working on larger vessels. There is also the possibility in their fourth summer for cadets to attend the Leadership Course (Ledarkurs) which trains Cadets to act as assistant instructors, who can then teach younger students.

During the winter cadets have the chance to improve their knowledge of what they have learned during the summer courses. Emphasis is placed on navigation, and cadets are expected to have passed the Inshore Yachtmaster Diploma and Coastal Yachtmaster Diploma before they have completed their three years. In the summer months as well as attending the summer schools Cadets have the opportunity to sail with the SNV fleet schooners HSwMS Gladan or HSwMS Falken and participate in exchanges under the International Sea Cadet Association (ISCA).

Local units
 Blekinge Sjövärnskår
 Sjövärnskåren Stockholm
 Sjövärnskårsdivision Syd
 Gotlands Sjövärnskår
 Gävleborgs Sjövärnskår
 Göteborgs Sjövärnskår
 Kalmarsunds Sjövärnskår
 Nordvästra Skånes Sjövärnskår
 Norra Smålands Sjövärnskår
 Norrbottens Sjövärnskår
 Roslagens Sjövärnskår
 Sydöstra Skånes Sjövärnskår
 Södermanlands Sjövärnskår
 Södertörns Sjövärnskår
 Västernorrlands Sjövärnskår
 Öresunds Sjövärnskår
 Östergötlands Sjövärnskår

See also 
Home Guard
Swedish Voluntary Flying Corps
Swedish Voluntary Radio Organization

Footnotes

References

External links
 

Swedish Navy
Volunteer organizations in Sweden
Naval Cadet organisations
Swedish military youth groups